{{DISPLAYTITLE:C10H14}}
The molecular formula C10H14 may refer to:

 C4-Benzenes
 Butylbenzenes
 n-Butylbenzene
 sec-Butylbenzene
 tert-Butylbenzene
 Isobutylbenzene
Cymenes
 o-Cymene
 m-Cymene
 p-Cymene
 Diethylbenzenes
 o-Diethylbenzene
 m-Diethylbenzene
 p-Diethylbenzene
 Tetramethylbenzenes
 1,2,3,4-Tetramethylbenzene (prehnitene)
 1,2,3,5-Tetramethylbenzene (isodurene)
 1,2,4,5-Tetramethylbenzene (durene)
 1,3-Dehydroadamantane